AZCA, an acronym for Asociación Mixta de Compensación de la Manzana A de la Zona Comercial de la Avenida del Generalísimo ("Mixed Association for Compensation of the A Block of the Commercial Area of the Avenue of the Generalisimo", now called the Avenue of Paseo de la Castellana), is a financial district in Madrid, Spain. The business district, which is located on the northern edge of the city centre, serves as one of the two main financial districts of the Madrid metropolitan area.

History
It is located between the streets Raimundo Fernández Villaverde, Orense, General Perón and Paseo de la Castellana. Its original conception (and its name) dates back to the Plan General de Ordenación Urbana de Madrid (PGOU), approved in 1964. The purpose of this plan was to create a huge block of modern office buildings with metro and railway connections in the expansion area of northern Madrid, just in front of Real Madrid stadium (currently named the Santiago Bernabéu Stadium) and beside the new government complex of Nuevos Ministerios. A botanical garden, a library and an opera house were also included in the plans, but these were never built.

The construction began in the 1970s after many delays. Nowadays some of the tallest and most beautiful modern Madrid skyscrapers are placed here. The most important are:

 Torre Picasso (157 m)
 Torre Europa (121 m)
 Banco de Bilbao Tower (107 m)
 Torre Titania (104 m)
 Torre Mahou (100 m)

In February 2005, Windsor Tower (106 m) was destroyed by a fire, and it was later replaced by Torre Titania.

During the weekend nights, the underground levels attract a Latino audience to the discos but they also have a reputation for gang violence.

In 2007, a new skyscraper area was built farther north along Paseo de la Castellana.

The carless surfaces inside the block have attracted young supporters of urban culture.
Since the 1980s, break dancers, rappers, skateboarders, graffiti writers and parkour traceurs from other Madrid neighborhoods have been gathering there.

See also 
 Plaza de Pablo Ruiz Picasso

References

External links

 Photos of AZCA 
 Satellite AZCA view from Google Earth
  Complejo AZCA. A description.

Buildings and structures in Tetuán District, Madrid
AZCA, Madrid
Skyscraper office buildings in Madrid
Cuatro Caminos neighborhood, Madrid